Charles Lescat (19 February 1887 – 1948) was an Argentine citizen, who studied in France and wrote in Je suis partout, the ultra-Collaborationist journal headed by Robert Brasillach.

Born as Carlos Hipólito Saralegui Lesca in Buenos Aires, he volunteered for the French Army during World War I. There, Lescat became a personal friend of Charles Maurras, leader of the Action française (AF) monarchist movement. Part of the AF, he presided over the administration council of Je suis partout, and was editor in chief of this review for a time. In 1941 he published an anti-Semitic book titled Quand Israël se venge (When Israel takes revenge), through the Éditions Grasset publishing house.

After the Liberation of Paris, he took refuge in Germany before travelling to Francoist Spain. He arrived in Uruguay in 1946, and later established himself in Juan Peron's Argentina. There, he organized one of the ratlines used by collaborators and Nazi fugitives. Lescat helped Pierre Daye find refuge in Argentina.

Lescat was sentenced to death in absentia in May 1947 by the High Court in Paris, but, despite extradition requests from France, Lescat, a native Argentine citizen, was never extradited. He died in Argentina in 1948.

Sources
Charles Lescat - extradiciones 

1887 births
1948 deaths
People from Buenos Aires
Argentine collaborators with Nazi Germany
Nazis in South America
Argentine people of French descent
People sentenced to death in absentia
Argentine people of Basque descent
Argentina in World War I
Argentine expatriates in France